Marquez Williams (born July 16, 1994) is a former American football fullback. He played college football at Mars Hill University and the University of Miami. He was drafted by the Jacksonville Jaguars in the seventh round of the 2017 NFL Draft and has also played for the Cleveland Browns.

Professional career

Jacksonville Jaguars
Williams was drafted by the Jacksonville Jaguars in the seventh round, 240th overall, in the 2017 NFL Draft. On May 12, 2017, the Jaguars signed Williams to a four-year, $2.47 million contract with a signing bonus of $71,224. He was waived/injured on September 1, 2017 and placed on injured reserve. He was released on October 9, 2017.

Cleveland Browns
On December 23, 2017, Williams was signed to the Cleveland Browns' practice squad. He was promoted to the active roster on December 29, 2017.

The Browns waived Williams on August 17, 2018 after failing to report to training camp.

Atlantic City Blackjacks
On April 2, 2019, Williams was assigned to the Atlantic City Blackjacks.

Houston Roughnecks
In 2019, Williams was picked by the Houston Roughnecks in the 2020 XFL Draft. He was placed on injured reserve during final roster cuts on January 22, 2020. He was activated from injured reserve on February 12, 2020. He had his contract terminated when the league suspended operations on April 10, 2020.

References

External links
Jacksonville Jaguars bio

1994 births
Living people
African-American players of American football
American football fullbacks
Atlantic City Blackjacks players
Cleveland Browns players
Houston Roughnecks players
Jacksonville Jaguars players
Mars Hill Lions football players
Miami Hurricanes football players
Players of American football from Georgia (U.S. state)
Sportspeople from Athens, Georgia
21st-century African-American sportspeople